Gatsuurt Gold Mine is a planned open-pit gold mining site in Mongolia located about 110 kilometers (70 mi) north of the capital Ulaanbaatar in Mandal sum (district) of Selenge Province in northern Mongolia. Gatsuurt gold mine is 35 kilometers east of Boroo Gold Mine.

History
Gatsuurt had initially been developed by the Canadian mining company Centerra Gold. However, the project encountered permitting delays with the Mongolian government and pressure from local activists. A local organization called the Save Mount Noyon Movement sprung up to oppose development of the mine on grounds of concern about environmental contamination of local rivers and pastures and access to Mount Noyon, a place of worship.

Centerra Gold eventually gave up entirely on Mongolia. It sold its Mongolian business unit (including the Boroo project and related infrastructure as well as the Gatsuurt development property) to OZD Asia Pte Ltd., a private Singapore based company.

References

Gold mines in Mongolia
Surface mines in Mongolia